Torgny Peak is a bare rock peak 2 nautical miles (3.7 km) west of Fenriskjeften Mountain in the Drygalski Mountains of Queen Maud Land. Photographed from the air by the German Antarctic Expedition (1938–39). Mapped from surveys and air photos by Norwegian Antarctic Expedition (1956–60) and named for Torgny Vinje, meteorologist with Norwegian Antarctic Expedition (1956–60).

Mountains of Queen Maud Land
Princess Astrid Coast